Barry Nabeh is a town in the Gambia. It is located in Sandu District in the Upper River Division. As of 2009, it has an estimated population of 171.

References

Populated places in the Gambia
Upper River Division